Anadasmus germinans is a moth of the family Depressariidae. It is found in Colombia.

The wingspan is about 27 mm. The forewings are light brownish-fuscous with well-marked scale-tufts above and below the middle at one-fifth. The plical and second discal stigmata are dark fuscous. There are fasciae of very faint darker suffusion crossing the wing at one-third and beyond the middle, the second slightly curved. There is a rather curved waved fuscous line from the costa at four-fifths to the dorsum before the tornus, sinuate towards the costa. The hindwings are grey, darker posteriorly and with an expansible fringe-tuft of long pale ochreous hairs from near the dorsum on the upper half projecting inwards beneath the abdomen.

References

Moths described in 1925
Anadasmus
Moths of South America